Courtney Tairi (born 15 July 1988) is a former New Zealand netball international. She also represented Australia at under-21 level. She was a member of the Australia team that won the 2009 World Youth Netball Championships. During the ANZ Championship era, Tairi played for New South Wales Swifts, Southern Steel and Waikato Bay of Plenty Magic. She finished her netball playing career with Northern Stars in the 2017 ANZ Premiership. Since retiring as a netball player, Tairi has worked a broadcaster, presenter and commentator for Sky Sport (New Zealand).

Early life, family and education
Tairi was born and raised in Sydney, New South Wales. Her parents were originally from New Zealand. Her father is a Māori from Cambridge. Her tribe is Tainui and her sub-tribe is Ngāti Korokī Kahukura. Her mother is a Pākehā from Invercargill. She has two sisters. She regularly spent family holidays in New Zealand. Tairi is both an Australian and New Zealand citizen. Between 2004 and 2005 she attended the Western Sydney Academy of Sport.

Playing career

Early years
Tairi began playing netball aged 7. She played competitively throughout her school years. She was first spotted by Julie Fitzgerald, her future coach at New South Wales Swifts and Waikato Bay of Plenty Magic,  when she was 14. In 2007 she was included in the Hunter Jaegers squad for the final season of the Commonwealth Bank Trophy era.

New South Wales
In 2007 and 2009, Tairi represented New South Wales in the Australian National Netball Championships at under-19 and under-21 levels. She was captain of the under-21 team that won seven of their eight games as they won the 2009 under-21 title.

Australian Institute of Sport
Between 2008 and 2009, Tairi played for the Australian Institute of Sport in the Australian Netball League. In both 2008 and 2009, she was a member of AIS teams that finished as runners up to Victoria Fury. In 2009 she won the Anne Clark Award. While playing for AIS, she also represented Australia at under-21 level.

New South Wales Swifts
Between 2009 and 2011, Tairi played for New South Wales Swifts. She made her senior Swifts debut in a 2009 ANZ Championship Round 14 match against Southern Steel. In 2010, Tairi played nine games for the Swifts, helping them win the 2010 ANZ Championship minor premiership.

Southern Steel
In 2012 and 2013, Tairi played for Southern Steel. She was eligible to play for Steel as a non-import player. Steel co-coach Natalie Avellino made the initial approach, inviting Tairi to play for Steel. In a 2012 Round 7 match against Northern Mystics, she suffered a season ending ACL injury.

Waikato Bay of Plenty Magic
Between 2014 and 2016, Tairi played for Waikato Bay of Plenty Magic. In a 2015 Round 1 match against Adelaide Thunderbirds, she suffered an achilles tendon rupture, ending her season after just one match. It was the third major injury of Tairi's career, following a 2007 knee injury her 2012 ACL injury. She returned to play for Magic in 2016 and was a member of the team that won the New Zealand Conference.

Northern Stars
Tairi finished her netball playing career with Northern Stars in the 2017 ANZ Premiership. She was named as vice captain to Leana de Bruin for the new franchise.

International career

Australia
In 2008 and 2009, Tairi was included in Australia under-21 squads. She was a member of the Australia U-21 team that won the 2009 World Youth Netball Championships and she was vice-captain of an Australia U-21 team during a tour of Jamaica.

New Zealand
In 2013, Tairi made three senior appearances for New Zealand. On 15 September 2013, she made her senior debut for New Zealand against Australia in the first test of the 2013 Constellation Cup. She was also a member of the New Zealand team that won the 2013 Fast5 Netball World Series. Tairi was included in the 2014–15 New Zealand squad. However injuries prevented her from making more appearances.

Broadcaster and presenter
Since retiring as a netball player, Tairi has worked a broadcaster, presenter and commentator for Sky Sport (New Zealand). She has presented coverage of a variety of sports competitions including tennis, ANZ Premiership, NRL and NRLW. She has hosted The Kiwi League Show, alongside Monty Betham, and presented on Warriors TV. She also fronted Sky Sport's coverage of the 2018 Summer Youth Olympics. At the 2020 ASB Classic she interviewed Serena Williams and Caroline Wozniacki.

Personal life
Tairi has had a relationship with Maurice Blair, a rugby league player.

Honours
New South Wales Swifts
ANZ Championship
Minor premiers: 2010
Waikato Bay of Plenty Magic
ANZ Championship – New Zealand Conference
Winners: 2016
Australia
World Youth Netball Championships
Winners: 2009
New Zealand
Fast5 Netball World Series
Winners: 2013
Australian Institute of Sport
Australian Netball League
Runners up: 2008, 2009
New South Wales
Australian National Netball Championships
Winner: Under-21 (2009)

References

1989 births
Living people
New Zealand international netball players
New Zealand netball players
Australian netball players
Netball players from Sydney
Hunter Jaegers players
Australian Institute of Sport netball players
New South Wales Swifts players
Southern Steel players
Waikato Bay of Plenty Magic players
Northern Stars players
Australian Netball League players
ANZ Championship players
ANZ Premiership players
Australian expatriate netball people in New Zealand
New Zealand netball commentators
New Zealand women television presenters
New Zealand television presenters
Rugby league players wives and girlfriends
New Zealand Māori netball players
New Zealand Māori broadcasters
New Zealand international Fast5 players